S,M,L,XL is a book by Rem Koolhaas and Bruce Mau, edited by Jennifer Sigler, with photography by Hans Werlemann.

Overview
The book was first published by Monacelli Press in 1995 in New York and 010 Publishers in Rotterdam. This enormous, 1376-page-long book is a collection of essays, diary excerpts, travelogues, photographs, architectural plans, sketches, cartoons produced by Office for Metropolitan Architecture (O.M.A.) in the twenty years prior to publication. O.M.A. is a Rotterdam-based company founded by Koolhaas in 1975. The second edition was published in 1997, printed and bound in Italy, and has the name Rem Koolhaas printed in orange ink on the cover unlike the original which was printed in yellow. The third, special edition was published in December 1998, printed and bound in Italy, and has the name Rem Koolhaas printed in blue ink on the cover. The book weighs .

Reception
The book became immediately popular, selling all the 30,000 copies of the first edition within months while it was counterfeited in China. The second edition printed in 70,000 copies has been subsequently exhausted as well.

See also 
"Disneyland with the Death Penalty", an article on Singapore critiqued by Koolhaas in the book

References

1996 anthologies
Architecture books
Essay anthologies
Books by Rem Koolhaas